Zechariah ( Zəḵaryāh, meaning "remembered by Yah"; also Zachariah, Zacharias) was the fourteenth king of the northern Israelite Kingdom of Israel, and son of Jeroboam II.

Zechariah became king of Israel in Samaria in the thirty-eighth year of Azariah, king of Judah. William F. Albright has dated his reign to 746 BC – 745 BC, while E. R. Thiele offers the dates 753 BC – 752 BC.

The account of his reign is briefly told in 2 Kings. According to the Bible, Zechariah did what was evil in the Lord's sight, as the previous kings of Israel since Jeroboam I had done. Zechariah ruled Israel for only six months before Shallum, a captain from his own army, murdered him and took the throne.

References

8th-century BC Kings of Israel
8th-century BC murdered monarchs
752 BC deaths
Biblical murder victims
Omrides
House of Jehu
Dethroned monarchs
Male murder victims